Sanjar Chang is a town and union council of Tando Allahyar District in the Sindh Province of Pakistan. It is part of Chamber Taluka and is located in the south-east of the district, the Union Council has a population of 35,169.

See also
 Ramapir Temple Tando Allahyar

References

Punjabi, Sindhi, Pathan are lived there with love, near that village two famous sugar mills namely 1.Tando Allah Yar Sugar mill 2.Chamber Sugar mill Tando Allah Yar Sugar mill is the biggest mill in Pakistan just 4 km away from village.2 private school are there 1.Ufaq academy 2.Sawera academy.it has one play ground.famous personalities are 1.Rais Kamal Khan

Union councils of Sindh
Populated places in Sindh